is a Japanese actress.

Filmography

Film

Television

References

External links
  
 
 
  Hiyori Sakurada Official Blog
 
 

2002 births
Living people
Japanese film actresses
Japanese television actresses
Japanese child actresses
21st-century Japanese actresses
Actors from Chiba Prefecture